HNLMS Utrecht (D817) was a destroyer of the . The ship was in service with the Royal Netherlands Navy from 1957 to 1980. The destroyer was named after the Dutch province of Utrecht and was the eighteenth ship with this name. In 1980 the ship was taken out of service and sold to Peru where it was  renamed Castilla. The ship's radio call sign was "PAEY".

Dutch service history
HNLMS Utrecht was one of eight s and was built at the KM de Schelde in Vlissingen. The keel laying took place on 15 February 1954 and the launching on 2 June 1956. The ship was put into service on 1 October 1957.

In 1959 the ship received eight torpedo tubes  so it could use the British MK 20E torpedo. After a few years these were removed however, because the Dutch navy favored American torpedoes.

In 1962 during the West New Guinea dispute Utrecht and the frigate  engaged Proa’s and fast attack craft in the Battle of Arafura Sea.

On 1 August 1980 the vessel was decommissioned and sold to the Peruvian Navy.

Peruvian service history

The ship was put into service on 6 October 1980 where the ship was renamed Castilla and decommissioned in 1990.

Notes

Friesland-class destroyers
1956 ships
Ships built in Vlissingen
Destroyers of the Cold War